Chivo may refer to:

 , a US Navy submarine
 El Chivo, a telenovela
 Emmanuel Lubezki (born 1964), Mexican cinematographer occasionally nicknamed "Chivo"
 Chivo, an electronic wallet - see Bitcoin in El Salvador

See also
 Estadio Universitario Alberto "Chivo" Córdoba, a multi-use stadium in Toluca, Mexico, on the campus of the Universidad Autónoma del Estado de México